The Grady County Schools District is a school district headquartered in Cairo, Georgia, United States. The district serves Grady County.

Schools

Secondary schools
 Cairo High School (Cairo)
 Washington Middle School (Cairo)

K-8 schools
 Shiver Elementary School (unincorporated area)
 Whigham Elementary School (Whigham)

Primary schools
 Eastside Elementary School (Cairo)
 Northside Elementary School (Cairo)
 Southside Elementary School (Cairo)

References

External links

School districts in Georgia (U.S. state)
Schools